Randy Lechard Culpepper (born May 16, 1989) is an American professional basketball player for Basket Brno of the NBL.

College career
He played for the University of Texas El Paso Miners. He is in Conference USA's top 15 all-time in career scoring, and in 2009–10 was named the Conference USA Men's Basketball Player of the Year. In Culpepper's first season, he was named NCAA sixth man of year. He averaged 12 points and 2 rebounds. In his second year he was a solid starter averaging 15 points and 3 rebounds. His 3rd year, he was a C-USA champ averaging 17 points, 4 rebounds, and 3 assists. He had the league high with 45 points against West Carolina. His senior year he averaged 19 points, 4 rebounds, and 2 assists.

Professional career
On June 29, 2011 he signed with Ferro-ZNTU of the Ukrainian SuperLeague. On April 26, 2012 he re-signed with them for one more season. In July 2013, he signed a two-year deal with Russian team Krasny Oktyabr. He was waived in March 2014. He then signed with Sagesse Beirut of Lebanon. However, he left Sagesse after only two games. In September 2014, he signed with Jilin Northeast Tigers. However, he did not pass the tryout period with the Chinese team. On October 31, 2014, he returned to his former team Krasny Oktyabr.

On July 26, 2015, he signed with Limoges CSP. On December 6, 2015, he left Limoges and signed with the Turkish club Beşiktaş for the rest of the season. 

In July 2016, Culpepper joined the Memphis Grizzlies for the 2016 NBA Summer League. On October 11, 2016, he signed with Turkish club Best Balıkesir for the 2016–17 season. On March 9, 2017, he parted ways with Balıkesir after appearing in 14 games.

On June 16, 2017, Culpepper signed with Italian club Pallacanestro Cantù for the 2017–18 season. Ha averaged 17.2 points, 3.3 rebounds and 3.6 assists per game. On October 1, 2018, Culpepper signed with Korean club Anyang KGC for the 2018–19 season.

On February 13, 2019, he has signed with Afyon Belediye of the Turkish Basketbol Süper Ligi (BSL).

On August 15, 2019, he has signed with Prometey Kamianske of the Ukrainian Basketball SuperLeague. 

At mid-season Culpepper signs for Pistoia Basket 2000 in the Italian championship that at that moment was competing not to relegate the Serie A2. He scored 20 points and grabbed four rebounds in his only game. On July 9, 2020, Culpepper signed with Scafati Basket.

On November 18, 2022, he signed with US Monastir, defending BAL champions, in Tunisia.

References

External links
UTEP Player biography
FIBA.com profile

1989 births
Living people
Afyonkarahisar Belediyespor players
American expatriate basketball people in France
American expatriate basketball people in Italy
American expatriate basketball people in Lebanon
American expatriate basketball people in Russia
American expatriate basketball people in South Korea
American expatriate basketball people in Turkey
American expatriate basketball people in Ukraine
American men's basketball players
Anyang KGC players
Scafati Basket players
Basketball players from Memphis, Tennessee
BC Krasny Oktyabr players
BC Prometey players
BC Zaporizhya players
Beşiktaş men's basketball players
Best Balıkesir B.K. players
Lega Basket Serie A players
Limoges CSP players
Pallacanestro Cantù players
Point guards
UTEP Miners men's basketball players
Sagesse SC basketball players
US Monastir basketball players
BC Brno players